The 1922 North Londonderry by-election was held on 2 June 1922.  The by-election was held due to the death of the incumbent UUP MP, Hugh T. Barrie.  It was won by the UUP candidate Malcolm Macnaghten.

References

1922 elections in the United Kingdom
By-elections to the Parliament of the United Kingdom in County Londonderry constituencies
Unopposed by-elections to the Parliament of the United Kingdom in Northern Irish constituencies
20th century in County Londonderry
1922 elections in Northern Ireland